Hapip Adventure ( NST)  is an outport village on the Eastport Peninsula in the Canadian province of Newfoundland and Labrador. , the population was 118.

Geography
Happy Adventure consists of three well-defined inlets known locally as of Upper Cove, Little Sandy Cove, and Lower Cove (which also contains a smaller attached cove known as Powell's Cove).

Etymology

The origin of the village name is a matter of some controversy. According to local lore, the name, which was first referenced in 1817, could have had any one of three origins. Some speculate it is a reflection of the joyful experience of the first settlers in finding such a welcoming environs. Alternatively, it has been postulated that the community was named to commemorate a ship belonging to 17th-century pirate Peter Easton. Still others suggest the community was named by George Holbrook, a British Admiralty hydrographer. Holbrook surveyed Newman Sound in 1817 and sheltered in one of Happy Adventure's coves during a storm.

Demographics 

See also
List of cities and towns in Newfoundland and Labrador
Farley Mowat, Author of "The Boat Who Wouldn't Float". The boat's name is "Happy Adventure", also named in reference to the pirate ship mentioned above.

References

External links
Family and Community Origins of the Eastport Peninsula
Happy Adventure - Encyclopedia of Newfoundland and Labrador, vol. 2, p. 795-797.

Populated coastal places in Canada
Towns in Newfoundland and Labrador